Stenhouse Glacier is a small glacier flowing into the head of Visca Anchorage immediately west of Stenhouse Bluff, on King George Island in the South Shetland Islands. Charted but not named by the French Antarctic Expedition, 1908–10, under Charcot. The name West Stenhouse Glacier arose locally for this feature in 1958 from association with Stenhouse Bluff, but the shortened form recommended by United Kingdom Antarctic Place-Names Committee (UK-APC) in 1960 has been adopted.

See also
 List of glaciers in the Antarctic
 Glaciology

References
 

Glaciers of King George Island (South Shetland Islands)